Sebastián D'Angelo (born 1989) is an Argentine football goalkeeper who currently plays for América de Quito.

Career

América de Quito
On 21 January 2020 it was confirmed, that D'Angelo had joined Ecuadorian club América de Quito.

References

External links

Living people
1989 births
Argentine footballers
Argentine expatriate footballers
Argentine people of Italian descent
Argentine Primera División players
Paraguayan Primera División players
Boca Juniors footballers
Club Atlético Tigre footballers
Newell's Old Boys footballers
Sportivo Luqueño players
Atenas de San Carlos players
Central Norte players
Association football goalkeepers
Argentine expatriate sportspeople in Paraguay
Argentine expatriate sportspeople in Uruguay
Argentine expatriate sportspeople in Ecuador
Expatriate footballers in Paraguay
Expatriate footballers in Uruguay
Expatriate footballers in Ecuador